Rahman Khalilov (born September 13, 1977, Baku, Azerbaijan) is Russian and Azerbaijani businessman.

Early life and education 
He grew up in Moscow in Russia. His father Iskender Agasalim oglu Khalilov held the posts of Vice President of LUKOIL Oil Company and Vice President of the state oil company Slavneft. Now he is the founder and president of ISR-Holding, which specializes in iodine production, car trade, development business, and hotel and restaurant business.

He graduated from the European University in Geneva, Switzerland in 1998. In 2001 he received a diploma from the Faculty of International Business of the International University of Geneva.

Career 
During the period from 1997 to 2007, he worked at various positions in Lukoil-Turkey and Litasco S.A. (Switzerland) which are within PJSC "LUKOIL", as well as the head of the oil trading company RIROIL (Switzerland), part of ISR-Holding.

In 2008, he became the owner of a large business for the transportation of oil and petroleum products, the Chairman of the Management Board of the RAILGO group of companies (formerly known under the brand name of ISR Trans). The company specializes in the provision of freight forwarding services for the transportation of crude oil, liquefied hydrocarbon gases, petroleum products and petrochemicals by rail transport and water transport, as well as multimodal transportation. Under the leadership of Mr. Khalilov, the company became one of the leaders in the cargo transportation market and became one of the largest owners of tank cars in Russia (the 3rd place). Парк подвижного состава RAILGO насчитывает свыше 30 тыс. единиц. RAILGO's rolling stock has over 30 thousand units. The volume of freight traffic in 2019 amounted to 30 million tons. The structure of RAILGO includes the shipping company Taganrog Tanker Fleet and a company that provides services for the transshipment of petroleum products, the LLC Kurgannefteprodukt in Taganrog.

“It is difficult to run a large business in Russia. Everyone has his/her own path. There is nothing to be afraid of. If you stand still then they will trample you. The main condition for business is to be feisty and strong." – in an interview with Vzglyad.azIn 2014, he carried the Azerbaijani flag during the opening ceremony of the Winter Olympic Games in Sochi. He was President of the Azerbaijani Winter Sports Federation (2013—2015).

Charity 

In 2017, he founded a charity project We Invest in the Future. The project helps talented orphans, athletes and children from low-income families. The participants receive personal scholarships and targeted assistance, and become guests of educational and cultural events. Under the egis of the project, charitable performances of the Vaganova Academy of Russian Ballet are held in Moscow every year under the direction of Nikolai Tsiskaridze.

References

Living people
International Olympic Committee members
Azerbaijani sportspeople
1977 births
Russian businesspeople in the oil industry
Azerbaijani businesspeople
Azerbaijani philanthropists